California Proposition 90 was an amendment of the Constitution of California relating to property tax assessments for older homeowners. It was proposed by the California State Legislature and approved by voters in a referendum held on  November 8, 1988.

The amendment allows homeowners over the age of 55 to transfer the assessed value of their present home to a replacement home if the replacement home is located in another county, is of equal or lesser value than the original property, if the county of the replacement dwelling adopts an ordinance participating in the program.

The following counties allow for Proposition 90 transfers into the county: Alameda, El Dorado, Los Angeles, Orange, Riverside, San Bernardino, San Diego, San Mateo, Santa Clara, Tuolumne, and Ventura. The county of El Dorado will stop taking property tax transfers through Proposition 90 on December 12, 2018.

See also 
 California Proposition 13 (1978)
 California Proposition 60 (1986)

References

External links 
 Exclusions from Reappraisal – Frequently Asked Questions about Propositions 60/90  published by the California State Board of Equalization

1988 California ballot propositions
Taxation in California
1988